Pherothrinax is a genus of tephritid  or fruit flies in the family Tephritidae.

Species
Pherothrinax arrhiza (Bezzi, 1924)
Pherothrinax bistellata (Bezzi, 1924)
Pherothrinax furcatella (Bezzi, 1924)
Pherothrinax lamborni (Munro, 1935)
Pherothrinax lutescens (Bezzi, 1924)
Pherothrinax mutila (Bezzi, 1924)
Pherothrinax pulchella (Bezzi, 1924)
Pherothrinax redimitis Munro, 1957
Pherothrinax subcompleta (Bezzi, 1920)
Pherothrinax woodi (Bezzi, 1924)

References

Tephritinae
Tephritidae genera
Diptera of Africa